The 2002 Thalgo Australian Women's Hardcourts was a tennis tournament played on outdoor hard courts on the Gold Coast, Queensland in Australia that was part of Tier III of the 2002 WTA Tour. The tournament was held from 30 December 2001 through 5 January 2002. First-seeded Venus Williams won the singles title.

Finals

Singles

 Venus Williams defeated  Justine Henin 7–5, 6–2

Doubles

 Justine Henin /  Meghann Shaughnessy defeated  Åsa Svensson /  Miriam Oremans 6–1, 7–6(7–6)

External links
 WTA tournament edition details
 ITF tournament edition details

 
Thalgo Australian Women's Hardcourts
Brisbane International
Thal